Cuza Vodă may refer to several places in Romania, named after Prince (Vodă) Alexandru Ioan Cuza:

 Cuza Vodă, Călărași
 Cuza Vodă, Constanța
 Cuza Vodă, Galați
 Cuza Vodă, a village in Salcia Tudor Commune, Brăila County
 Cuza Vodă, a village in Stăncuța Commune, Brăila County
 Cuza Vodă, a village in Viişoara, Botoşani
 Cuza Vodă, a village in Sălcioara, Dâmbovița
 Cuza Vodă, a village in Ipatele Commune, Iaşi County
 Cuza Vodă, a village in Popricani Commune, Iaşi County
 Cuza Vodă, a village in Spineni Commune, Olt County